Adorned Brood is a German folk black metal band from Neuss, Germany.

History (1993–2006) 

After the foundation in 1993, Adorned Brood recorded two demo tapes. They signed a contract to German music label Folter Records. They recorded their first studio album Hiltia in 1996. They recorded a new album, called Wigand, in 1998. Only 1,000 copies of each album were released.

They signed a contract with Moonstorm Records. Their third album, Asgard, was released in 2000. Lead singer Erik Hecht from the band Subway to Sally joined Adorned Brood for their fourth album, Erdenkraft, in 2000.

They toured with Subway to Sally, and played at the music festivals Summer Breeze Open Air, Partysan, Wave Gotik Treffen and Feuertanz Festival.

Line-up

Current line-up 
 Markus 'Teutobot' Frost - vocals, bass guitar (1993–present)
 Thorsten Derks - guitar (2004–present)
 Jan Jansohn - guitars (2009-)
 Niklas Enns - keyboards (2008-)
 Anne - flute (2009-)
 Mischa Kliege - drums (2011-)

Live members 
 Mike "Ariovist" Engelmann ("Black sails over Europe Tour 2009")

Former members 
 Klaus Röhrig - vocals (1993–1995)
 Nermin 'Oberon' Hadžović - guitar (1993–1997)
 Thorsten Riekel - guitar (1994)
 Andreas Samek - guitar (1997–2004)
 Benjamin Ulkan - guitar (2001–2007)
 Ingeborg Anna Baumgärtel vocals, flute (1996–2008)
 Tim Baumgärtel - drums, piano (1998–2010)
 Mirko 'Pagan' Klier - guitar (1993–2001, 2007–2009)
 Mike 'Ariovist' Engelmann - drums (1993-1998 & 2010-2011)

Timeline

Discography

Demos 
Phobos/Deimos (1994)
Wapen (1995)
Rehearsal '96 (1996)

Studio albums 
 Hiltia (1996)
 Wigand (1998)
 Asgard (2000)
 Erdenkraft (2002)
 Heldentat (2006)
 Noor (2008)
 Hammerfeste (2010)
 Kuningaz (2012)

References

External links

 Official Homepage
 

German heavy metal musical groups
German black metal musical groups
German folk metal musical groups
Viking metal musical groups
Musical groups established in 1993
1993 establishments in Germany